The 1997 Romanian Open was an ATP men's tennis tournament held on outdoor clay courts in Bucharest, Romania that was part of the World Series of the 1997 ATP Tour. It was the fifthe edition of the tournament and was held from 22 September through 29 September 1993. Unseeded Richard Fromberg won the singles title.

Finals

Singles

 Richard Fromberg defeated  Andrea Gaudenzi 6–1, 7–6(7–2)
 It was Fromberg's only singles title of the year and the 4th and last of his career.

Doubles

 Luis Lobo /  Javier Sánchez defeated  Hendrik Jan Davids /  Daniel Orsanic 7–5, 7–5

References

External links
 ITF tournament edition details

Romanian Open
Romanian Open
R
September 1997 sports events in Europe